Grote Prijs Gerrie Knetemann was a single-day road bicycle race held annually in June–July in Gelderland, Netherlands from 2006-2008. Since, 2007 the race was organized as a 1.1 event on the UCI Europe Tour.

Winners men's race

Winners women's race

External links
Official Website 
2007 edition by cyclingnews.com

UCI Europe Tour races
Cycle races in the Netherlands
2006 establishments in the Netherlands
Defunct cycling races in the Netherlands
Recurring sporting events established in 2006
Recurring sporting events disestablished in 2007
2007 disestablishments in the Netherlands